Eshly Bakker (born 10 February 1993) is a Dutch footballer who plays as midfielder or forward in the Netherlands Eredivisie for Ajax and the Netherlands national team.

Club career
Born in Amsterdam, she started her career at amateur club RKSV Pancratius from Badhoevedorp. In 2010, aged 17 she moved to Eredivisie club ADO Den Haag. She won the women's Dutch League (Eredivisie) and Cup in the 2011–12 season with ADO Den Haag at the age of 19. Her second Dutch Cup title came in the 2013–14 season, during the time she played for AFC Ajax. She moved to FC Twente before joining German women's Bundesliga club MSV Duisburg on 16 June 2017.

International career
Bakker progressed through the national youth teams, where she played for the under-15, under-16, under-17 (including the 2010 UEFA Women's Under-17 Championship) and under-19.

She made her debut for the Netherlands senior national team on 5 April 2014, in a 2015 FIFA Women's World Cup qualification match against Greece, coming on as a substitute and scoring the last goal of the 6–0 win.

International goals
Scores and results list the Netherlands goal tally first.

Honours
ADO Den Haag
 Eredivisie (1): 2011–12
 KNVB Women's Cup (1): 2011–12

Ajax
 KNVB Women's Cup (3): 2013–14, 2018-19, 2021-22,

References

External links
 
 Eshly Bakker at Onsoranje.nl 
 Eshly Bakker at vrouwenvoetbalnederland.nl 
 

1993 births
Living people
Footballers from Amsterdam
Dutch women's footballers
Netherlands women's international footballers
Dutch expatriate sportspeople in Germany
Expatriate women's footballers in Germany
Eredivisie (women) players
Frauen-Bundesliga players
ADO Den Haag (women) players
AFC Ajax (women) players
FC Twente (women) players
MSV Duisburg (women) players
Women's association football midfielders
Women's association football forwards
Dutch expatriate women's footballers